Brigade Lake is a  lake located on Vancouver Island west of Sproat Lake.

See also
List of lakes of British Columbia

References

Alberni Valley
Lakes of Vancouver Island
Clayoquot Land District